The Eidsvoll 1814s are an American football team based in Eidsvoll, Norway. They are currently members of the Norway American Football Federation (NoAFF). Their name is taken from the signing of the Constitution of Norway at Eidsvoll in 1814.

History

Eidsvoll 1814s were founded in 1995 by Kenneth Andersen, Jarle Østhagen and Bård Aune and started play the following year as a Division II team.  Going undefeated in league play during their first two seasons, the 1814s won back-to-back Division II championships.  In 1998, they joined Division I where they lost in double-overtime to the Oslo Vikings in their first playoff appearance at that level.  They won their first division I league championship in 2001.

In 2008, they were automatically qualified to play in the European Football League quarter finals.

Head coaches

References

External links
Eidsvoll 1814s Official Website
NoAFF Official Website

American football teams in Norway
1995 establishments in Norway
American football teams established in 1995
Eidsvoll